Economic Insights (formerly Business Review) is a quarterly publication of the Federal Reserve Bank of Philadelphia comprising articles written by in-house staff economists aimed at readers with a general interest in economic issues. Topics covered include economic policy, banking, and financial and regional economics.

History

Business Review has been published on a quarterly basis since 1925, and online archives from 1975 onward are available on the Federal Reserve Bank of Philadelphia.

References

External links

 

Economics journals
Quarterly journals